Parornix spiraeifoliella is a moth of the family Gracillariidae. It is known from British Columbia, Canada.

The larvae feed on Spiraea species. They mine the leaves of their host plant. The mine has the form of a much wrinkled mine on the underside of the leaf.

References

Parornix
Moths of North America
Moths described in 1918